Events in the year 1935 in Turkey.

Parliament
 4th Parliament of Turkey (up to 1 March)
 5th Parliament of Turkey (from 1 March)

Incumbents
President – Kemal Atatürk
Prime Minister – İsmet İnönü

Ruling party and the main opposition
 Ruling party – Republican People's Party (CHP)

Cabinet
7th government of Turkey (up to 1 March)
8th government of Turkey (from 1 March)

Events
4 January – The 6.4  Erdek–Marmara Islands earthquake affected the area with a maximum Mercalli intensity of VIII (Severe), leaving five people dead and thirty injured.
1 February – Hagia Sophia is converted into a museum.
1 March – New government
8 February – General elections. 17 female MPs
1 May – 1935 Digor earthquake
27 May: Sunday, rather than Friday, becomes the day of rest.
19 October – A group of assassins aiming to assassinate Atatürk were arrested.
20 October – Census (Population 16,158,018)

Births
20 January – Güven Sazak, businessman (d. 2011)
2 February – Tuncay Mataracı, politician (d. 2020)
20 August – Gürdal Duyar, sculptor (d. 2004)
21 August – Adnan Şenses, singer
4 October – İlhan Cavcav, sports club director
13 December – Türkan Saylan, academic, MD, social activist (d. 2009)
date unknown – Ümit Kaftancıoğlu, Turkish writer (d. 1980)

Deaths
8 January – Rauf Yekta (born 1871), musician
3 March – Ali Rıfat Çağatay (born 1869), musician
11 March – Yusuf Akçura (born 1879),  writer, historian
27 May – Ahmet Cevdet Oran (born 1862), journalist

Gallery

References

 
Years of the 20th century in Turkey
Turkey
Turkey
Turkey